In English grammar, a nominative absolute is a free-standing (absolute) part of a sentence that describes the main subject and verb. It consists of a noun in the common case or a pronoun in the nominative case joined with a  predicate that does not include a finite verb and functioning usually as a sentence modifier, the most common being an adjective or a participle (present participle or past participle in English). 

It is usually at the beginning or end of the sentence, although it can also appear in the middle. Its parallel is the ablative absolute in Latin, the genitive absolute in Greek, or the locative absolute in Sanskrit.

One way to identify a nominative absolute is to add a conjunction and a verb: one can often (though not always) create a subordinate clause out of a nominative absolute by adding a subordinating conjunction (such as "because" or "when") and a form of the verb to be.

Examples:

Sentences with Nominative Absolute,

 The dragon slain, the knight took his rest.
 The battle over, the soldiers trudged back to the camp.
 The truck finally loaded, they said goodbye to their neighbors and drove off.
 We sit side by side, our legs touching, comfortable in the warm silence our two bodies create. 
 Spring advancing, the swallows arrived.
Compared with Sentences with Clauses or Adverbial Prepositional Phrases,

 Because the dragon was slain, the knight took his rest.
 When the battle was over, the soldiers trudged back to the camp.
 After the truck was finally loaded, they said goodbye to their neighbors and drove off.
 With our legs touching, we sit side by side, comfortable in the warm silence our two bodies create.
 When Spring was advancing, the swallows arrived.

References 
 Absolute Constructions from the American Heritage Book of English Usage (1996).
 Nominative Absolute Merriam-Webster Dictionary.
 Nominative Absolute Collins Dictionary.

English grammar
Grammar
Syntax